Townsend Dickinson (1795 – February 1851) was a justice of the Arkansas Supreme Court from 1836 to 1842, serving as one of the first three members of the court.

Born in New York, Dickinson came to the Arkansas Territory shortly after its acquisition by the United States, and settled at Batesville, Arkansas, in 1821. In 1823 he was elected to the territorial legislature, and was made by that body prosecuting attorney of his district. In 1833, he was made U.S. Land Office Registrar for Batesville. He was a delegate to the constitutional convention of 1836, and of the first state legislature, by which he was elected to the supreme bench that same year. After his term expired in 1842, he returned to practice in Batesville.

A judge Byers of Batesville relayed an anecdote which illustrates Dickinson's legal acumen:

Dickinson died from drowning in a lake in Corpus Christi, Texas, at about age 55. He and a companion were attempting to cross the lake in a buggy at night, and missed their road, ending up in deep water.

References

1795 births
1851 deaths
Members of the Arkansas House of Representatives
Justices of the Arkansas Supreme Court
Deaths by drowning in the United States